Charles Edward Underdown (3 December 190815 December 1989) was an English theatre, cinema and television actor. He was born in London and educated at Eton College in Berkshire.

Notable work
Early theatre credits include: Noël Coward's Words and Music and Tonight at 8.30; Cole Porter's Nymph Errant; Moss Hart & Irving Berlin's  Stop Press; and Streamline.

His film credits include: They Were Not Divided, Beat the Devil, Wings of the Morning, The Rainbow Jacket, The Woman's Angle, Her Panelled Door, The Camp on Blood Island, Dr. Terror's House of Horrors, Thunderball, Khartoum, The Magic Christian and Digby, the Biggest Dog in the World.

Television appearances include: Dad's Army, Danger Man, The Saint, The Avengers, The Rat Catchers, Weavers Green, Man in a Suitcase, Doomwatch, The Regiment, Colditz, Upstairs, Downstairs, Survivors, The Duchess of Duke Street and Doctor Who.

Both Wings of the Morning and The Rainbow Jacket were set in his beloved racing world, the former being set on Epsom Downs. Wings of the Morning, starring Henry Fonda, was Britain's first Technicolor film.

Edward Underdown was also a gentleman jockey and rode with great aplomb both on the flat and over sticks (see references to his riding career in John Hislop's books).

In 1950 he was voted by British exhibitors as the most promising male screen newcomer.

According to Ian Fleming's stepson, Underdown was the novelist's preferred choice for James Bond.

Personal life
Edward Underdown was born on 3 December 1908 in London.

Underdown was the son of Harry Charles Baillie Underdown and Rachel Elizabeth Orr. He married Hon. Rosemary Sybella Violet Grimston, daughter of Robert Grimston, 1st Baron Grimston of Westbury and Sybil Rose Neumann, on 10 February 1953. Charles Underdown and Rosemary Grimston were sixth cousins through their common grandparents Thomas Villiers, 1st Earl of Clarendon and Lady Charlotte Capell.

He died on 15 December 1989 in Hampshire aged 81.

Theatre appearances

 Words and Music, Adelphi Theatre, London (1932-1933). The production was written and directed by Noël Coward.
 Nymph Errant, Adelphi Theatre, London (1933-1934). The production featured music and lyrics by Cole Porter. 
 Streamline (revue), Palace Theatre, London (1932-1933).
 Stop Press, Adelphi Theatre, London (1934-1935). This was the London production of Moss Hart and Irving Berlin's revue, As Thousands Cheer.
 Tonight at 8.30 (billed as To-night at 7:30, due to the local curtain time), Liverpool Empire Theatre, Liverpool (November 1935) 
 Tonight at 8.30, Phoenix Theatre, London (opened 9 January 1936) and New York (opened 24 November 1936). 
 You Can't Take It with You, St. James's Theatre, London (opened 1937).
 The Grass is Greener, St Martin's Theatre, London (1958) and Theatre Royal, Brighton.
 The Long Sunset, Mermaid Theatre, London (1961).
 Past Imperfect, Theatre Royal, Brighton (1965).

Filmography

 The Warren Case (1934) - Hugh Waddon
 Girls, Please! (1934) - Jim Arundel
 Annie, Leave the Room! (1935) - John Brandon
 Wings of the Morning (1937) - Don Diego
 The Drum (1938) - Undetermined Role (uncredited)
 Inspector Hornleigh (1939) - Peter Dench the Chancellor's Secretary
 Lucky to Me (1939) - Malden's Friend (uncredited)
 Inspector Hornleigh Goes To It (1941)
 The October Man (1947) - Passport Official
 The Woman in the Hall (1947) - Neil Ingelfield
 Brass Monkey (1948) - Max Taylor
 Man on the Run (1949) - Slim Elfey
 They Were Not Divided (1950) - Philip
 The Woman with No Name (1950) - Lake Winter
 The Dark Man (1951) - Detective Inspector Viner
 The Promise (1952)
 The Woman's Angle (1952) - Robert Mansell
 The Voice of Merrill (1952) - Hugh Allen
 Street of Shadows (1953) - Det. Insp. Johnstone
 Recoil (1953) - Michael Conway
 Beat the Devil (1953) - Harry Chelm
 The Rainbow Jacket (1954) - Tyler
 The Camp on Blood Island (1958) - Major Dawes
 The Two-Headed Spy (1958) - Kaltenbrunner
 Information Received (1961) - Drake
 The Third Alibi (1961) - Dr. Murdoch
 The Day the Earth Caught Fire (1961) - Dick Sanderson
 Edgar Wallace Mysteries (Locker 69) (1962) - Bennett Sanders
 The Bay of St. Michel (1963) - Col. Harvey
 Dr. Crippen (1963) - The Prison Governor
 Man in the Middle (1963) - Major Wyclif
 Woman of Straw (1964) - First Executive (uncredited)
 Traitor's Gate (1964) - Inspector Adams
 Dr. Terror's House of Horrors (1965) - Tod (segment 1 "Werewolf")
 Thunderball (1965) - Sir John, Air Vice Marshal
 Khartoum (1966) - Col. William Hicks
 Triple Cross (1966) - Air Marshal
 The Great Pony Raid (1968) - Snowy
 The Hand of Night (1968) - Otto Gunhter
 The Magic Christian (1969) - Prince Henry (uncredited)
 The Last Valley (1971) - Gnarled Peasant
 Running Scared (1972) - Mr. Betancourt
 Digby, the Biggest Dog in the World (1973) - Grandfather
 The Abdication (1974) - Gustav II Adolf, Christina's father
 Tarka the Otter (1979) - Hibbert

Television appearances

 Dial 999 (TV series) (1959) - Heads or Tails, Episode 36, (filmed in 1958). Harley.
 One Step Beyond (1961) -The Tiger, Season 3, Episode 34, 20 June 1961. Mr. Hayes.
 Danger Man (1964-1966) - Max Dell / Capt. Morgan / Lord Anthony Denby
 The Saint (1965) - Jack Laurie
 The Avengers - episodes The Murder Market , The Living Dead (1965, 1967) - Jonathan Stone / Rupert Staplow 
 The Rat Catchers (1966) - Lemnitz
 Weavers Green (1966) - Bobby Brent
 Man in a Suitcase (1967-1968) - Maxted / Ranki
 Doomwatch (1970) - Chairman of Tribunal
 Dad's Army (1972) - Major General Sir Charles Holland
 The Regiment (1973) - ICS Man
 Colditz (1974) - Col. Mansell
 Upstairs, Downstairs - episode News from the Front (1974) - General Nesfield 
 Survivors (1977) - Frank Garner
 The Duchess of Duke Street (1977) - Adjutant-General
 Doctor Who (in the serial Meglos) (1980) - Zastor (final appearance)

Love of horses
Edward Underdown's father owned a Norfolk estate in the Stanford Battle area. It was here that Edward learnt and developed his riding.

Before his career as an actor Edward was a gentleman jockey and rode with great aplomb both on the flat and over sticks (see references to his riding career in John Hislop's books).

The Norfolk estate is mentioned in Bill Pertwee's book about the making of Dad's Army. One of the Dad's Army episodes was by co-incidence filmed at the estate. By this time the estate was owned by the War Office and nothing was left except for the verandah and stables. As soon as John Le Mesurier arrived he realised it was familiar to him from weekend parties Edward's father had invited him to in the 1930s. So it was that Edward found himself working in a television series that featured part of his old home.

The films Wings of the Morning and The Rainbow Jacket'' were set in his beloved racing world, the former being set on Epsom Downs.

Finally, after his acting career he worked as a steward at Newbury Racecourse. This was described by Bill Pertwee as "fitting for a man who not only loved horses but was also an expert rider." (ibit, page 86).

Military service
On wanting to sign-up, Edward Underdown's first approach was to the Wiltshire Yeomanry. He reputedly appeared at the depot with his friend, Sandy Carlos Clarke, who had recently returned from Canada working as a ranch hand. When asked by the recruiting Sergeant to state their professions, Underdown replied, "film star" and Carlos Clarke answered, "cowboy" and thinking this was a joke, the sergeant stated that their services were not required. Underdown did subsequently join the Wiltshire Yeomanry whilst Clarke found a post with another Yeomanry regiment.

Underdown went on to have a distinguished Second World War record as an officer in the Wiltshire Yeomanry serving in the 8th Army in Africa.

After the war Edward resumed his acting career but remained in the Territorial Army. He remained in the Territorial Army Reserve of Officers until he reached the age limit. He retired as captain on 7 November 1959 and retained the rank of honorary major.

References

External links

 
 

1908 births
1989 deaths
English male film actors
English male television actors
English male stage actors
People educated at Eton College
Male actors from London
20th-century English male actors